Smilodectes is a genus of adapiform primate that lived in North America during the middle Eocene. It possesses a post-orbital bar and grasping thumbs and toes. Smilodectes has a small cranium size and the foramen magnum was located at the back of the skull, on the occipital bone.

Named species 

There are three named species: Smilodectes gracilis, Smilodectes gingerichi and Smilodectes mcgrewi.

Smilodectes gracilis 
Smilodectes gracilis was an adapiformes primate from the early Eocene, some 55 million years ago. S. gracilis was found on the land mass of North America and based on its dental morphology, S. gracilis was a folivore.

This species lacked symphyseal fusion and this species of primate had comparatively reduced olfactory bulbs and a more expanded visual cortex. This suggests that S. gracilis was a diurnal species. S. gracilis had a cranial capacity of 9.5 cc. It is thought that S. gracilis had an average body mass of around 2.1 kilograms. Based upon its postcranial skeleton, S. gracilis was a vertical clinger and leaper.

References

Bibliography

External links 
 Mikko's Phylogeny Archive
 Smilodectes gracilis information

Prehistoric strepsirrhines
Prehistoric primate genera
Eocene primates
Ypresian life
Lutetian life
Wasatchian
Bridgerian
Eocene mammals of North America
Paleontology in Colorado
Paleontology in Utah
Paleontology in Wyoming
Fossil taxa described in 1903